Route 202 is an east/west 140-kilometre highway in the Monteregie and Estrie regions of the province of Quebec, Canada. Its western terminus is at the junction of Route 132 in Sainte-Barbe and its eastern terminus is in southern Cowansville at the junctions of Route 104 and Route 139. The highway runs a few kilometres north of the Canada–United States border for most of its length.

Municipalities along Route 202
 Sainte-Barbe
 Huntingdon
 Hinchinbrooke
 Franklin
 Havelock
 Hemmingford (township)
 Hemmingford (village)
 Saint-Bernard-de-Lacolle
 Lacolle
 Noyan
 Clarenceville
 Venise-en-Québec
 Pike River
 Stanbridge Station
 Bedford (township)
 Bedford (city)
 Stanbridge East
 Dunham
 Cowansville

Major intersections

See also
 List of Quebec provincial highways

References

External links
 Provincial Route Map (Courtesy of the Quebec Ministry of Transportation) 
Route 202 in Google Maps

202